The 1969 Queensland state election was held on 17 May 1969.

Retiring Members

Labor
Peter Byrne MLA (Mourilyan)
Jim Donald MLA (Ipswich East)
John Dufficy MLA (Warrego)
Jack Duggan MLA (Toowoomba West)
Fred Graham MLA (Mackay)
Johnno Mann MLA (Brisbane)

Country
Eddie Beardmore MLA (Balonne)
Alf Muller MLA (Fassifern)

Liberal
Ray Smith MLA (Windsor)

Independent
Bunny Adair MLA (Cook)
Arthur Coburn MLA (Burdekin)
Ted Walsh MLA (Bundaberg)

Candidates
Sitting members at the time of the election are shown in bold text.

See also
 1969 Queensland state election
 Members of the Queensland Legislative Assembly, 1966–1969
 Members of the Queensland Legislative Assembly, 1969–1972
 List of political parties in Australia

References
 

Candidates for Queensland state elections